Glucan endo-1,3-alpha-glucosidase (endo-1,3-alpha-glucanase, mutanase, endo-(1->3)-alpha-glucanase, cariogenase, cariogenanase, endo-1,3-alpha-D-glucanase, 1,3(1,3, 1,4)-alpha-D-glucan 3-glucanohydrolase) is an enzyme with systematic name 3-alpha-D-glucan 3-glucanohydrolase. The enzyme catalyses the following chemical reaction

 Endohydrolysis of (1->3)-alpha-D-glucosidic linkages in isolichenan, pseudonigeran and nigeran

Products from pseudonigeran (1,3-alpha-D-glucan) are nigerose and alpha-D-glucose.

References

External links 
 

EC 3.2.1